Jamali Shadat (18 September 1941 – 3 February 2021) was a Malaysian comedian known for his ventriloquism and mimicry which are seen in his roles as Atan and Atok in various stage plays.

Career
His fame began when he was the first runner up of a Bakat TV competition. After his newly found fame, he was invited to record his jokes on gramophones and later on cassettes and CDs. His comedy is known for being able to appeal to people of different racial backgrounds. His life has  played a major role in his comedy as the characters of Atan and Atok were inspired by his village and his upbringing where he met people of different races.

Death
Jamali died on 3 February 2021 at age of 79, following an old age. He was laid to rest beside the grave of his late wife at the Sungai Pinang Muslim Cemetery in Pulau Indah, Selangor after Zuhr prayers.

Filmography
All films are in Malay, unless otherwise noted.

Television

His other television appearances include Atan Oh Atan Oi (2000), and the Jamali Shadat Show (2001).

Awards and nominations

References

External links
 

1942 births
2021 deaths
Malaysian film actors
20th-century Malaysian male actors
21st-century Malaysian male actors
Malaysian comedians
Malaysian Muslims
Malaysian people of Malay descent
People from Selangor